Macalla is a genus of snout moths. It was described by Francis Walker in 1859.

Species
 Macalla albifurcalis Hampson, 1916 (India)
 Macalla arctata (Druce, 1902)
 Macalla atrincinctalis Hampson, 1916 (India)
 Macalla brachyscopalis Hamsoin, 1912 (India)
 Macalla carbonifera (Meyrick, 1932) (India)
 Macalla chosenalis Shibuya, 1927
 Macalla dimidialis (Snellen, 1890) (India)
 Macalla eumictalis Hampson, 1912 (India)
 Macalla exrufescens Hampson, 1896 (India)
 Macalla fasciculata Hampson, 1906
 Macalla finstanalis Schaus, 1922
 Macalla hyalinalis Amsel, 1956
 Macalla hypnonalis Hampson, 1896 (India)
 Macalla hypoxantha Hampson, 1896
 Macalla madegassalis Viette, 1960 (Madagascar)
 Macalla mesoleucalis Hampson, 1916 (India)
 Macalla metasarcia Hampson, 1903 (India)
 Macalla mixtalis Walker, [1866]
 Macalla nauplialis Walker, 1859
 Macalla nebulosa Schaus, 1912
 Macalla niveorufa Hampson, 1906
 Macalla noctuipalpis (Dognin, 1908)
 Macalla nubilalis (Hampson, 1893) (India)
 Macalla ochroalis Hampson, 1916 (India)
 Macalla pallidomedia Dyar, 1910
 Macalla parvula Hampson, 1896 (India)
 Macalla phaeobasalis Hampson, 1916 (India)
 Macalla plicatalis Hampson, 1903 (India)
 Macalla regalis E. D. Jones, 1912
 Macalla rufibarbalis Hampson, 1903
 Macalla rufitinctalis (Warren, 1896)
 Macalla scoporhyncha Hampson, 1896
 Macalla seyrigalis Marion & Viette, 1956 (Madagascar)
 Macalla thyrsisalis Walker, [1859]
 Macalla zelleri (Grote, 1876)

References

External links

 

Epipaschiinae
Pyralidae genera
Taxa named by Francis Walker (entomologist)